Dee Jaywalker is a Belgian punk rock musician and songwriter. He is best known as lead guitar player and songwriter for Marky Ramone & the Speedkings.

Career
Jaywalker started his career as a punk rocker in the late 1970s, releasing a first single "Tropical Stumble" with Organized Pleasure in 1980. The single immediately became a radio hit and stayed in the charts for 10 weeks.

His work with Definitivos gave Jaywalker his first major break in the Belgian punk scene. After putting out several records from 1980 to 1985, Definitivos became The Whydads and released a full album in 1988 before calling it quits in 1989. A couple of Definitivos singles later appeared on the Bloodstains Compilations.

From then on, Jaywalker performed with many bands, most notably The Midnight Men, Goldengalaxyjerks and Faroutski - with whom he released a CD and toured in the UK.
Around the same time, as a side project, Jaywalker started the rockabilly band The Greyhounddogs, which attracted a following in Belgium. In 2004, Devilshitburner Records released We're getting closer to the grave each day, a punk/heavy metal/rockabilly tribute to Hank Williams, for which The Greyhounddogs recorded a cover of "Lost highway".

In 2001, Jaywalker joined Marky Ramone & the Speedkings, who put out a first album, No If's And's or But's on White Jazz Records/JVC Japan. The band did three European tours, and released a live album, Alive, on Rawk-A-Hula Records in 2002.  The band released the album Legends Bleed in 2002 on Thirsty Ear Records and did a world tour from 2002 to January 2003. Five 7-inches came out from 2002 to the end of 2003, including a split single with Texas Terri.

From 2004 on Jaywalker has performed as a solo artist, writing and recording punk 'n' roll with his solo band. His solo album, 59 O'Clock, was released in 2006 on Nicotine Records.

In 2007, Jaywalker and music journalist Thomas 'thomaxe' Goze organized a Euro Tour for ex-Johnny Thunders and the Heartbreakers guitarist Walter Lure. The line up for the tour consisted of Walter Lure (lead guitar and vocals), Dee Jaywalker (lead guitar and vocals), Paolo Serlino (drums), Rine Reginna (bass and backing vocals), and Annette Gucci (guitar and backing vocals). The last show of the tour was recorded and released as a live album in 2008.

In 2010, Definitivos celebrated their comeback with a best of album Courtrai Tonight, released on Deaf Records. The band played a number of shows with Jaywalker on guitar.

Discography

With Organized Pleasure
"Tropical Stumble" (1980)

With Definitivos
Dee Jaywalker himself played and wrote only the last 12' inch "Sightseeing - Bilateral Deals - Besse

"Mister C"
"Modern Dance"
"All I Know"
"Courtrai Tonight"
"Sightseeing"
"Bilateral deals"
"Besse"

With Whydads
That's why (1988)
 Harde Tijden (comp.) (1988)

With Marky Ramone and the SpeedKings
"Ride Tonight" (2001)
No Ifs Ands Or Buts (2001, White Jazz Records; 2002, JVC Records)
Legends Bleed (2002, Thirsty Ear Records)
Alive (2002, Rawk'A Hula)
"I've Got Dee Dee On My Mind" (2002)
"Rawk Over Scandinavia" (2002)
"Love Hates Me" (2003)
"Girls & Gasoline" (2003)
"Good Cop Bad Cop/Sidewalkin" (September 2003)

With Greyhounddogs
We're Getting Closer To The Grave Each Day: A Tribute To Hank Williams performing "Lost Highway" (2004)

Solo
59 O'Clock (2006, Nicotine Records)

With Walter Lure
Walter Lure Live in Berlin (2008, Nicotine Records)

Sources 
Nicotine Records
About Dee Jaywalker, Ramones Website
French show review
Italian Article
French article on the official Mouscron website
Definitivos
Definitivos on Bloody Belgium
Definitivos on Bloodstains Across
Short Bio of Dee Jaywalker on this SpeedKings article
NYRock review of the Speedkings album
Interview with Dee Jaywalker for SideWalkin'
German article about the SpeedKings
SpeedKings on Ragazzi Music
Faroutski Official Site
New York Waste
Loud Fast Rules Magazine

External links

Living people
Punk rock musicians
Year of birth missing (living people)
Place of birth missing (living people)